Sohail Ahmed (born 5 November 1985) is a Pakistani first-class cricketer who played for Lahore.

References

External links
 

1985 births
Living people
Pakistani cricketers
Lahore cricketers
Cricketers from Lahore